First Class is 2008 Singaporean comedy television series produced by local TV station MediaCorp.

This new comedy series takes a humorous yet insightful look at the education system in Singapore - specifically, Secondary School.

The interactive website was a Nominee for 2009 International Digital Emmy (Children & Young People).

Synopsis
In Achiever Secondary School, a new teacher fresh from NIE arrives for his first day of school, his mind filled with thoughts of sweet young kids who are willing to learn and altruistic dedicated teachers eager to teach. He later finds that his dream job has some nightmare moments, the kids are not so easy to lovingly nurture and the teachers he loved and respected are somewhat lacking when he has to work alongside them.

Also, a group of new Secondary 1 students become friends, learning through school activities and classes about growing up and the meaning of true friendship, and sometimes even learn something academic, if they're lucky.

Cast

Episodes

Season 1 (2008)
"Series #" refers to the episode's number in the overall series, whereas "Episode #" refers to the episode's number in this particular season.

{| class="wikitable plainrowheaders" border="1" style="background: #FFF;" width="99%"
|-
! style="background: #F79A3A;" | Series#
! style="background: #F79A3A;" | Episode#
! style="background: #F79A3A;" | Title
! style="background: #F79A3A;" | Directed by
! style="background: #F79A3A;" | Written by
! style="background: #F79A3A;" | Original airdate

|}

Season 2 (2009)
"Series #" refers to the episode's number in the overall series, whereas "Episode #" refers to the episode's number in this particular season.

{| class="wikitable plainrowheaders" border="1" style="background: #FFF;" width="99%"
|-
! style="background: #F79A3A;" | Series#
! style="background: #F79A3A;" | Episode#
! style="background: #F79A3A;" | Title
! style="background: #F79A3A;" | Directed by
! style="background: #F79A3A;" | Written by
! style="background: #F79A3A;" | Original airdate

|}

External links

 First Class

Singaporean television series
Singaporean comedy television series